Dropbox is a file hosting service operated by the American company Dropbox, Inc., headquartered in San Francisco, California, U.S. that offers cloud storage, file synchronization, personal cloud, and client software. Dropbox was founded in 2007 by MIT students Drew Houston and Arash Ferdowsi as a startup company, with initial funding from seed accelerator Y Combinator.

Dropbox has experienced criticism and generated controversy for issues including security breaches and privacy concerns.

Dropbox has been blocked in China since 2014.

Concept 
Dropbox brings files together in one central place by creating a special folder on the user's computer. The contents of these folders are synchronized to Dropbox's servers and to other computers and devices where the user has installed Dropbox, keeping the same files up-to-date on all devices. Dropbox uses a freemium business model, where users are offered a free account with set storage size, with paid subscriptions available that offer more capacity and additional features. Dropbox Basic users are given two gigabytes of free storage space. Dropbox offers computer apps for Microsoft Windows, Apple macOS, and Linux computers, and mobile apps for iOS, Android, and Windows Phone smartphones and tablets. In March 2013, the company acquired Mailbox, a popular email app, and in April 2014, the company introduced Dropbox Carousel, a photo and video gallery app. Both Mailbox and Carousel were shut down in December 2015, with key features from both apps implemented into the regular Dropbox service. In October 2015, it officially announced Dropbox Paper, its collaborative document editor.

History

Dropbox founder Drew Houston conceived the Dropbox concept after repeatedly forgetting his USB flash drive while he was a student at MIT.

Houston founded Evenflow, Inc. in May 2007 as the company behind Dropbox, and shortly thereafter secured seed funding from Y Combinator. Dropbox was officially launched at 2008's TechCrunch Disrupt, an annual technology conference. Owing to trademark disputes between Proxy, Inc. and Evenflow, Dropbox's official domain name was "getdropbox.com" until October 2009, when it acquired its current domain, "dropbox.com". In October 2009, Evenflow, Inc. was renamed Dropbox, Inc.

In an interview with TechCrunch's "Founder Stories" in October 2011, Houston explained that a demo video was released during Dropbox's early days, with one viewer being Arash Ferdowsi. Ferdowsi was "so impressed" that they formed a partnership. In regards to competition, Houston stated that "It is easy for me to explain the idea, it is actually really hard to do it."

User growth 
Dropbox saw steady user growth after its inception. It surpassed the 1 million registered users milestone in April 2009, followed by 2 million in September, and 3 million in November. It passed 50 million users in October 2011, 100 million in November 2012, 500 million in 2016, and 700 million in 2021.

Acquisitions
In July 2012, Dropbox acquired TapEngage, a startup that "enables advertisers and publishers to collaborate on tablet-optimized advertising". The following December, Dropbox acquired two companies; Audiogalaxy, a startup "allowing users to store their music files and playlists in the cloud then stream them to any device", and Snapjoy, a company that allowed users to "aggregate, archive and view all of their digital photos from their cameras, phones and popular apps like Flickr, Instagram and Picasa, and then view them online or via an iOS app". In July 2013, Dropbox acquired Endorse, a "mobile coupon startup".

In May 2014, Dropbox acquired Bubbli, a startup that has "built some innovative ways of incorporating 3D technology into 2D views, and packaging it in a mobile app".

In January 2015, Dropbox acquired CloudOn, a company that provided mobile applications for document editing and creation. At the same time, Dropbox told TechCrunch that CloudOn's base in Herzliya would become the first Dropbox office in Israel. In July, Dropbox acquired Clementine, an enterprise communication service.

In April 2014, Dropbox acquired photo-sharing company Loom (which would be shut down and integrated with the then-recently announced Carousel), and document-sharing startup Hackpad. Dropbox later announced in April 2017 that Hackpad would be shut down on July 19, with all notes being migrated to Dropbox Paper.

In January 2019, Dropbox acquired e-signature company HelloSign. The acquisition was reported to be Dropbox's largest to date, at a reported $230 million.

In March 2021, Dropbox announced the acquisition of DocSend. DocSend offers a secure document sharing and analytics product.

Remote workforce 
At the start of the Covid-19 pandemic in 2020, Dropbox was one of the first companies to shift to a remote workforce. In October 2020, the company announced its "virtual first" initiative which would shift the company to a long-term remote working plan, which launched officially April 2021.

2021 workforce reduction
In January 2021, Dropbox CEO Houston announced the layoff of 315 employees, which is approximately 11 percent of the current workforce. The company said the reductions were necessary in order to focus the company team structure and focus on top level priorities. The software firm also announced that COO Olivia Nottebohm would be leaving the company on February 5, 2021. In the same month, announced it would sublease much of its office space in a transition to remote work.

Platforms
Dropbox has computer apps for Microsoft Windows, Apple macOS, and Linux computers, and mobile apps for iOS, Android, and Windows Phone smartphones and tablets. It also offers a website interface. As part of its partnership with Microsoft, Dropbox announced a universal Windows 10 app in January 2016.

Dropbox's apps offer an automatic photo uploading feature, allowing users to automatically upload photos or videos from cameras, tablets, SD cards, or smartphones to a dedicated "Camera Uploads" folder in their Dropbox. Users are given 500 megabytes of extra space for uploading their first photo, and are given up to 3 gigabytes of extra space if users continue using the method for more photos.

In July 2014, Dropbox introduced "streaming sync" for its computer apps. Streaming sync was described as a new "supercharged" synchronization speed for large files that improves the upload or download time by up to 2 times.

In August 2015, Dropbox announced the availability of "Universal 2nd Factor" USB security keys, providing two-factor authentication for logging into its services.

System requirements for the Dropbox app

Windows 

 The Dropbox app for Windows requires:
 Windows 7, 8, 8.1, or 10 (in standard mode)
 An NTFS-formatted hard drive
 Processors other than ARM (except in S mode) 
 The latest Dropbox app

Windows 10 in S mode 

 The Dropbox app for Windows in S mode requires:
 Windows 10 with Redstone 2 Update (1703) or later
 The Dropbox app from the Microsoft Store
 ARM processors are supported for the S mode application 
 The latest Dropbox app

Linux 
The Dropbox app for Linux requires:

 Ubuntu 14.04 or later
 Fedora 21 or later
 Glibc 2.19 or later
 The latest Dropbox app 
A Linux computer formatted with any of the following file systems:
 ext4
 zfs (on 64-bit systems only)
 eCryptFS (back by ext4)
 xfs (on 64-bit systems only)
 btrfs

iPhone and iPad 
The Dropbox app for iPhone and iPad requires:

 The latest Dropbox app
 iOS 12 or later

Mac 
The Dropbox app for Mac requires:

 OS X Yosemite 10.10 or later 
 On macOS Sierra, the experience may be different
 The latest Dropbox app

Android 
The Dropbox app for Android requires:

 Android 6 or later
 The latest Dropbox app

Financials
Dropbox received initial funding from seed accelerator Y Combinator. Dropbox also raised US$1.2 million in Series A funding from Sequoia Capital in 2007, that "along with interest (on that amount) converted to equity as part of the Series A investment, which included a fresh slug of US$6 million", bringing the total amount to US$7.25 million, with the round closed in 2008 and documents filed in 2009.

A May 2010 report in The Wall Street Journal said that "since [founder Drew Houston] started reading Eric Ries' Lean startup blog about a year ago, the company has started trickling out new features when they are ready instead of waiting to launch a fully featured product. That helps test customer appetite, he says, dubbing the practice "minimum viable product".

TechCrunch reported in July 2011 that Dropbox had been looking to raise between US$200 and US$300 million, and had a valuation "to end up in the $5 billion to $10 billion range. [...] quite a step up from its previous funding rounds which have totalled a tiny $7.2 million". As noted in a Forbes article, Dropbox had "revenue on track to hit $240 million in 2011".

In April 2012, Dropbox announced that Bono and The Edge, two members of the Irish rock band U2, were individual investors in the company.

In 2014 Dropbox raised financing from BlackRock Inc. and others that values the company at $10 billion.

In March 2017, Bloomberg reported that Dropbox had secured a US$600 million credit line, with the company expected to file for its initial public offering (IPO) "as soon as this year".

In February 2018, Dropbox filed an IPO to be listed on the Nasdaq. The company's initial intent was to raise $500 million. Dropbox's stock rose 42 percent to $29.89 in its first day of trading on March 23, 2018.

As of February 2021, Dropbox has been profitable in the last three quarters, whilst also having no debt.

Business model
Dropbox uses a freemium business model, where users are offered a free account with a set storage size, with paid subscriptions available that offer more capacity and additional features. Accordingly, Dropbox's revenue is a product of how many users they can convert to their paid services.

Dropbox Basic users are given two gigabytes of free storage space. This can be expanded through referrals; users recommend the service to other people, and if those people start using the service, the user is awarded additional 500 megabytes of storage space. Dropbox Basic users can earn up to 16 gigabytes through the referral program.

The Dropbox Plus subscription (named Dropbox Pro prior to March 2017) gives users 2 terabytes of storage space, as well as additional features, including:

 Advanced sharing controls: When sharing a link to a file or folder, users can set passwords and expiration limits.
 Remote wipe: If a device is stolen or lost, users can remotely wipe the Dropbox folder from the device the next time it comes online.
 "Extended Version History": An available add-on, it makes Dropbox keep deleted and previous versions of files for one year, a significant extension of the default 30-day recovery time.

In November 2013, Dropbox announced changes to "Dropbox for Business" that would enable users to connect both their personal Dropbox and their business Dropbox to the same device, with each of the folders being "properly labeled for personal or work, and come with its own password, contacts, settings, and files". Furthermore, Dropbox announced shared audit logs, remote wipe for business administrators, and account transfers, as new features of its Business offering. In January 2017, Dropbox introduced "Smart Sync" for Business and Enterprise customers, a feature that lets Windows and macOS users see all files in the Dropbox folder, but only download specific files on-demand.

Similar to Dropbox Basic, Dropbox Plus users can also earn extra space through referrals. Plus users earn 1 gigabyte per referral, up to 32 gigabytes.

Dropbox Business is Dropbox's application for corporations, adding more business-centered functionality for teams, including collaboration tools, advanced security and control, unlimited file recovery, user management and granular permissions, and options for unlimited storage. For large organizations, Dropbox offers Dropbox Enterprise, the "highest tier" of its product offerings, adding domain management tools, an assigned Dropbox customer support member, and help from "expert advisors" on deployment and user training.

In July 2016, Dropbox announced a new "AdminX" administrator dashboard for Business customers, offering improved control of company files and users. In June 2017, the AdminX dashboard was given a redesign and additional administrator functions, such as log-in durations, custom password strength parameters, and setting specific subdomain verifications for individual teams.

Company partnerships
In September 2012, Facebook and Dropbox integrated to allow users in Facebook Groups to share files using Dropbox. In 2013, Samsung pre-loaded the Dropbox mobile application on its Android devices and Dropbox provided extra space for users owning Samsung's devices. In November 2014, Dropbox announced a partnership with Microsoft to integrate Dropbox and Microsoft Office applications on iOS, Android and the  applications on the web.
On July 10, 2018, Dropbox announced its partnership with Salesforce aiming to improve brand engagement and team productivity.

Technology

The Dropbox software enables users to drop any file into a designated folder. The file is then automatically uploaded to Dropbox's cloud-based service and made available to any other of the user's computers and devices that also have the Dropbox software installed, keeping the file up-to-date on all systems. When a file in a user's Dropbox folder is changed, Dropbox only uploads the pieces of the file that have been changed, whenever possible.

When a file or folder is deleted, users can recover it within 30 days. For Dropbox Plus users, this recovery time can be extended to one year, by purchasing an "Extended Version History" add-on.

Dropbox accounts that are not accessed or emails not replied in a year are automatically deleted.

Dropbox also offers a LAN sync feature, where, instead of receiving information and data from the Dropbox servers, computers on the local network can exchange files directly between each other, potentially significantly improving synchronization speeds. LAN Sync discovers other peers on the same network via UDP port 17500 using a proprietary discovery protocol developed by early Dropbox engineer Paul Bohm in 2010.

Originally, the Dropbox servers and computer apps were written in Python. In July 2014, Dropbox began migrating its performance-critical backend infrastructure to Go.

In September 2012, Dropbox's website code base was rewritten from JavaScript to CoffeeScript.

Dropbox originally used Amazon's S3 storage system to store user files, but between 2014 and 2016 they gradually moved away from Amazon to use their own hardware, referred to as "Magic Pocket", due to Dropbox's description as "a place where you keep all your stuff, it doesn’t get lost, and you can always access it". In June 2017, the company announced a major global network expansion, aiming to increase synchronization speeds while cutting costs. The expansion, starting with 14 cities across 7 countries on 3 continents, adds "hundreds of gigabits of Internet connectivity with transit providers (regional and global ISPs), and hundreds of new peering partners (where we exchange traffic directly rather than through an ISP)".

Dropbox uses SSL transfers for synchronization and stores the data via Advanced Encryption Standard (AES)-256 encryption.

The functionality of Dropbox can be integrated into third-party applications through an application programming interface (API).

Dropbox prevents sharing of copyrighted data, by checking the hash of files shared in public folders or between users against a blacklist of copyrighted material. This only applies to files or folders shared with other users or publicly, and not to files kept in an individual's Dropbox folder that are not shared.

Mailbox

In March 2013, Dropbox acquired Mailbox, a popular email app, with Mailbox CEO Gentry Underwood saying that "Rather than grow Mailbox on our own, we've decided to join forces with Dropbox and build it out together". Under the deal, the developers of Mailbox joined Dropbox, but kept Mailbox running as a stand-alone app. The acquisition was reported to cost $100 million.

In December 2015, Dropbox announced the shut-down of Mailbox.

Carousel

In April 2014, Dropbox introduced Carousel, a photo and video gallery that "combines the photos in your Dropbox with the photos on your phone, and automatically backs up new ones as you take them." Carousel sorted photos by event and date. In December 2015, Dropbox announced the shut-down of Carousel. In a blog post, Drew Houston and Arash Ferdowsi explained that "We'll be taking key features from Carousel back to the place where your photos live - in the Dropbox app."

Dropbox Paper

In April 2015, Dropbox launched a Dropbox Notes collaborative note-taking service in beta testing phase, prompting speculation if Dropbox was planning to bring out a product to compete with Google Docs. TechCrunch noted that Dropbox Notes appeared to be a new version of "Project Composer", a previous iteration of the service with roots from the acquisition of Hackpad in April 2014. In October 2015, Dropbox announced the upcoming launch of Dropbox Paper, its collaborative document editor, noted by the media as the result of its development of a Dropbox Notes service earlier in 2015. Dropbox Paper entered open beta in August 2016, allowing anyone to join and test the product. Mobile apps for Android and iOS were also released. In January 2017, Dropbox Paper was officially launched. Aimed for businesses, Dropbox Paper was described as "one part online document, one part collaboration, one part task management tool, one part content hub" by Rob Baesman, Dropbox's head of product, and allows for importing, editing, and collaboration on "a number of other file types from Google, Microsoft, and others".

User-created projects
Users have devised a number of uses for and mashups of the technology that expand Dropbox's functionality. These include: sending files to a Dropbox via Gmail; using Dropbox to sync instant messaging chat logs; BitTorrent management; password management; remote application launching and system monitoring; and as a free web hosting service.

Reception
Dropbox has received several awards, including the Crunchie Award in 2010 for Best Internet Application, and Macworlds 2009 Editor's Choice Award for Software. It was nominated for a 2010 Webby Award, and for the 2010 Mac Design Awards by Ars Technica. Dropbox's mobile iPhone app release in 2010 was among the top 10 "best apps" selected by Alex Ahlund, former CEO of two websites focused on mobile apps, and the company's Android app was also selected as one of the top five "best apps" in a list compiled in 2010 by Jason Hiner for ZDNet. Founders Drew Houston and Arash Ferdowsi were named among the top 30 under 30 entrepreneurs by Inc. in 2011.

In 2011, Business Insider named Dropbox the world's sixth most valuable startup, and in 2017, the publication ranked Dropbox as the eighth most valuable US startup, with a valuation of $10 billion. It has been described as one of Y Combinator's most successful investments to date. Apple launched its own cloud storage service later in 2011, iCloud, but this didn't hold back Dropbox's growth. In January 2012, Dropbox was named startup of the year by TechCrunch, and in 2016, the company was ranked #2 on the Forbes Cloud 100 list.

Privacy and security concerns

Dropbox has been the subject of criticism and controversy related to multiple incidents, including a June 2011 authentication problem that let accounts be accessed for several hours without passwords; a July 2011 Privacy Policy update with language suggesting Dropbox had ownership of users' data; concerns about Dropbox employee access to users' information; July 2012 email spam with recurrence in February 2013; leaked government documents in June 2013 with information that Dropbox was being considered for inclusion in the National Security Agency's PRISM surveillance program; a July 2014 comment from NSA whistleblower Edward Snowden criticizing Dropbox's encryption keys being available to employees; the leak of 68 million account passwords on the Internet in August 2016; and a January 2017 accidental data restoration incident where years-old supposedly deleted files reappeared in users' accounts.

While Dropbox uses SSL to encrypt data in transit between itself and customers, it stores data in encrypted form and does not use end-to-end encryption in which the user controls the keys used to encrypt the stored data. As a result, Dropbox can decrypt customers' data if it chooses to.

Offices
The Dropbox headquarters, located in San Francisco, were originally on Market Street, until its expansion to the China Basin Landing building in July 2011, allowing for a significant space increase. As the number of employees grew, the company again needed expansion, and in February 2014, it signed a lease for two buildings in Brannan Street. Not needing the substantial amounts of space after all, the company started shopping the remaining available space to other companies for sublease in November 2015.

In December 2012, Dropbox set up an office in Dublin, Ireland, its first office outside the United States.

Dropbox expanded into its second U.S. office in Austin, Texas in February 2014. The State of Texas and City of Austin provided a $1.7 million performance-based incentives package to Dropbox in exchange for locating their office in Austin. In April, of the same year, Dropbox opened an office in Sydney, Australia.

See also

 Comparison of file hosting services
 Comparison of file synchronization software
 Comparison of online backup services

References

External links

 

2018 initial public offerings
Cloud applications
Cloud storage
Companies based in San Francisco
Companies listed on the Nasdaq
Companies' terms of service
Data synchronization
Email attachment replacements
File hosting for Linux
File hosting for macOS
File hosting for Windows
File sharing services
Go (programming language) software
Internet properties established in 2008
Online backup services
Software companies based in the San Francisco Bay Area
Software companies of the United States
Software that uses wxPython
Software that uses wxWidgets
South of Market, San Francisco
Universal Windows Platform apps
Webby Award winners
Y Combinator companies